Lee Hammock is a professional writer and game designer. Hammock has worked on numerous products for numerous companies, including NeoExodus: A House Divided RPG by Louis Porter Jr. Design, The Halo Graphic Novel and the Dawning Star Campaign Setting by Blue Devil Games.

Career
Lee Hammock co-designed the licensed Farscape role-playing game for Alderac Entertainment Group. He also co-designed the Dawning Star Campaign Setting with Justin D. Jacobson for Blue Devil Games.

Hammock has worked for DC Comics. Hammock wrote the story "The Last Voyage of the Infinite Succor" for The Halo Graphic Novel. He described the process of writing the story as a "heady task" since he had to respect Halo fans' knowledge of the characters and canon, ensuring that "characters that [the fans] know as a part of themselves are portrayed aptly". Hammock described the basis of the story as a way to showcase the true danger of the Flood as an intelligent menace, rather than something the player encounters and shoots. Hammock also stated that the story would prove the intelligent nature of the Flood, and "hopefully euthanize the idea that they are just space zombies".

Hammock co-designed the NeoExodus: A House Divided RPG for Louis Porter Jr. Design. He also co-designed the Arcane Tech book for the Fading Suns role-playing game.

Hammock was lead game designer on Fallen Earth. On April 5, 2010, the Fallen Earth team announced that Hammock was leaving Fallen Earth to work as story designer on a new MMO title, Gargantuan.

References

External links
Lee Hammock at Geekdo.com
Dawning Star website
Louis Porter Jr. Design website

American graphic novelists
Living people
Role-playing game designers
Year of birth missing (living people)